Pinguicula cyclosecta is a perennial rosette-forming insectivorous plant native to the state of Nuevo León in Mexico.

Description

The plants form small rosettes of leaves. During the summer months, the plant produces leaves that are covered in glandular hairs on their upper surface. These leaves are capable of catching, killing, and digesting small insect prey for the plant. The edges of the leaves may be tinged a bluish-purple, and in bright light, the entire leaf may be this color. During the winter months, the plant loses its carnivorous leaves and produces a rosette of reduced succulent leaves instead. Deep purple flowers are produced singly at the end of short scapes.

References

cyclosecta
Carnivorous plants of North America
Flora of Nuevo León